Mohd "Syamim Alif" bin Sobri (born August 5, 1993) in Kulim, Kedah, is a Malaysian footballer. In 2019 he played for Selangor United in Malaysia Premier League.

Early life 
Syamim attended the Bukit Jalil Sports School youth academy. He played for Harimau Muda B in Malaysia Premier League from 2010-2011.

Club career
At the end of 2012 Malaysia Super League season, he is given the chance to play due to loss of some key players. On 17 July 2012, he scored the only and his first ever goal for Kedah FA against Sabah FA in the 2013 Malaysia Super League/Malaysia Premier League Play-off round that ensure Kedah FA a spot in the final.

In 2015, Mohd Syamim Alif played with Kedah United F.C. in 2015 Malaysia FAM League.

In 2016,Mohd Syamim alif played with Penang Sg Ara fc in Malaysia FAM League.

In 2017,Mohd Syamim Alif moved to Pbms(selangor united fc) and help them to promoted in Malaysia Premier league 2019. With 23 appearances and score 11 goal.2nd in Malaysia Fam cup 2018 after defeated by Terengganu City Fc in finals.

References

External links
 Mohd Syamim Alif at Enotes.com
 

1993 births
Living people
Malaysian footballers
Kedah Darul Aman F.C. players
People from Kedah
Association football forwards